Simo Nikolić (born 28 August 1954) is a Yugoslav former footballer who played as a striker.

Career
During the 1970s, Nikolić was a member of Partizan for three seasons, but managed to play just 10 league games with the Crno-beli, scoring twice. He later enjoyed two prolific seasons with Galenika Zemun in the Yugoslav Second League, securing him a transfer to French club Lyon in 1980.

Honours
Partizan
 Yugoslav First League: 1975–76

References

External links
 
 

1954 births
Living people
People from Brčko District
Serbs of Bosnia and Herzegovina
Yugoslav footballers
Association football forwards
FK Partizan players
FK Zemun players
Olympique Lyonnais players
AS Béziers Hérault (football) players
Yugoslav First League players
Yugoslav Second League players
Ligue 1 players
Ligue 2 players
Yugoslav expatriate footballers
Expatriate footballers in France
Yugoslav expatriate sportspeople in France